The University of Health and Allied Sciences (UHAS) a public university located at Ho in the Volta Region of Ghana. UHAS is one of the youngest public universities in Ghana. Its operation started in September 2012, when the first batch of 154 students were admitted.

History
The university was established by an Act of Parliament(Act 828), which received presidential approval in December 2011. It, however, started admitting students in 2012. The university is devoted to teaching, research and service in the Health Sciences.
 
The university was formed with an Interim University Council that governs the affairs of the school chaired by Prof. Kofi Anyidoho, MA(Bloomington), PhD(Austin). The Foundation Vice-Chancellor was Professor Fred Newton Binka, MBChB (Legon), MPH (Jerusalem), PhD (Basel) who served from March 2012 to July 2016. In August, 2017, a new council was inaugurated with Justice Jones Victor Mawulorm Dotse as the chairman. Other members of the council comprise Professor John Owusu Gyapong (Vice-Chancellor, UHAS) ; Professor Victor Gadzekpo (Member),Dr. Sylvia Ayeley Deganus (Member), Dr. Nana Owusu-Afari (Member),Mr. Richard K. Adjei (Member), Dr. Mark Amexo (Member), Dr. Emmanuel Newman( NCTE), Mr. Courage Meteku ( Representative of CHASS), Professor Harry Kwami Tagbor (Representative of Convocation-professorial), Ms. Yaa Amankwaa Opuni (Representative of Convocation-professorial), Mr. Kwesi Aseredum Hagan (Representative of FUSSAG), Mr. Joshua Gadasu, (Representative of TEWU), Dr. Francis Zotor (Representative of UTAG), Mr. Derrick Asare (Representative of SRC).

Campuses 
The university has two campuses:
 Ho campus - main and central administrative campus
 Hohoe campus where the School of Public Health is located

Office of the Vice-Chancellor 
Professor John Owusu Gyapong is the current Vice-Chancellor of the University of Health and Allied Sciences

History of the Office 
 Professor Fred Newton Binka (2012-2016), Vice-Chancellor

Schools and institutes 
The university runs seven schools, one institute with four centres and a basic school.

Schools
 School of Basic and Biomedical Sciences
 School of Allied Health Sciences
 School of Nursing and Midwifery
 School of Public Health
 School of Pharmacy
 School of Medicine
School of Exercise Medicine 
UHAS Basic School

Institutes  
 Institute of Health Research
Institute of Traditional and Alternative Medicine (ITAM)

Centers 

 Center for Health Policy and Implementation Research (CHPIR)
 Center for Malaria Research (CMR)
 Center for Neglected Tropical Diseases Research (CNTDR)
 Center for Non-communicable Diseases Research (CNCDR)
Directorates
Academic Affairs 
Finance 
Human Resources 
Information Communication Technology 
Internal Audit 
International Programmes 
Library 
Public Affairs 
Works & Physical Development

Research Ethics Committee  
The university has a Research Ethics Committee REC that is charged with oversight responsibilities of reviewing and approving all research planned to be conducted in the university's facilities and/or involve the staff or students of the university.  The goal of the REC is to protect the rights and welfare of human participants in research studies.

The REC is made of seven (7) Scientists/Academics and 8 Non-scientists; including A lawyer, Journalist, Religious Body Representing the larger Community, Sociologist, Educationist, Traditional leader, Public Health Expert and a Medical Doctor

The officers of the REC include the chair, Vice Chair and the Administrator.

CUT OFF POINTS

SCHOOL OF NURSING AND MIDWIFERY

SCHOOL OF MEDICINE

SCHOOL OF PHARMACY

SCHOOL OF ALLIED HEALTH SCIENCES

SCHOOL OF BASIC AND BIOMEDICAL SCIENCES

SCHOOL OF PUBLIC HEALTH

Ranks 
The University of Health and Allied Sciences (UHAS) was ranked second in Ghana and 36th in Africa in the World Scientist and University Rankings 2021 by AD Scientific Index, beating out KNUST, UCC, and GIMPA, among other universities.

See also 
 List of universities in Ghana

External links 
 National Accreditation Board, Ghana

References 

Educational institutions established in 2011
2011 establishments in Ghana
Education in Volta Region
Universities in Ghana